Hylan Johnson (February 3, 1913 – August 22, 1986), professionally known as Dots Johnson,  .'s Johnson, and Dotts Johnson, was an American stage and film actor. He was best known for his roles as the American MP in Roberto Rossellini's 1946 film Paisan and as the boxing manager in the 1953 film The Joe Louis Story.

Filmography

References

External links

1913 births
1986 deaths
American male stage actors
American male film actors
African-American male actors
20th-century American male actors
20th-century African-American people